MS Amadea is a cruise ship owned by Amadea Shipping Company and operated under charter by the Germany-based Phoenix Reisen. She was originally built in 1991 by the Mitsubishi Heavy Industries shipyard in Nagasaki, Japan as MS Asuka for Nippon Yusen Kaisha. In 2006 she was replaced by the Asuka II and sold to her current owners and entered service with Phoenix Reisen.

Cabins
The Amadea contains 2 royal suites, 40 suites, and 254 cabins. 106 cabins have a private balcony.

Gallery

References

External links

 Phoenix Reisen official website

Cruise ships
Ships built by Mitsubishi Heavy Industries
1991 ships